Independent Iron Works (IIW) was an Oakland, California headquartered steel fabricator founded in the 1920s  by William G. Meagher from Port Angeles, Washington, later co-owned with Henry F. Gede, of Oakland. Secondary facilities were located in Los Angeles, California.

Contracts
Important contracts included girders for the James Lick Freeway in San Francisco, California, bridges along the Northern California Coast, and the Union Oil Building in Los Angeles, California.

Legal contests
IIW took several legal contests with United States Steel and Bethlehem Steel to US Federal Court over completive practices.

Sale
After a sale in 1958, the major facilities came under the ownership of  Phoenix Iron Works. The latter firm's name can be found on many roadway manhole covers in California.

References

Manufacturing companies based in Oakland, California
Ironworks and steel mills in the United States
1920s establishments in California